Layqa (Aymara and Quechua, also spelled Laica) is a mountain in the Bolivian Andes which reaches a height of approximately . It is located in the Cochabamba Department, Carrasco Province, Pocona Municipality.

References 

Mountains of Cochabamba Department